HMS Rattlesnake was a 21-gun  launched in 1861 at Chatham Dockyard and broken up in 1882. During her third commission from 1871–1873 she was  the flagship of Commodore John Edmund Commerell who was wounded at the start of the Third Anglo-Ashanti War. Rattlesnake was propelled by a Ravenhill & Salkeld tractor power engine delivering 1.628 IHP.  When operating under sailpower, her funnel could be retracted to clear the rigging and her propeller lifted into a special housing aft to streamline her hullform.

References

 

Jason-class corvettes
Ships built in Chatham
1861 ships